State Highway 29 (SH 29)  runs from  south of Menard, Texas, east to SH 95 in Circleville (6.0 miles north of Taylor) via Mason, Llano, Burnet, Liberty Hill, and Georgetown in central Texas, United States.

In Georgetown, SH 29 is known as University Avenue and is the main east–west artery through the city, passing in front of Southwestern University, which has been on the same road since its Georgetown campus opened in 1873.

An open house meeting at East View High School in Georgetown was held on September 1, 2015.  The meeting's purpose was to review the upcoming plans on widening SH 29 from 2 lanes (80 ft.) to 6 lanes (160 ft.).  Construction will not start until after the Summer of 2016 and will occur from Southwestern Blvd extending all the way to Hwy 95 in Circleville, TX.

Previous routes

SH 29 was proposed on October 8, 1917 on a route from Port O'Connor to Austin. On August 21, 1923, the section from Port Lavaca to Port O'Connor was cancelled. On January 21, 1924, SH 29 was extended to Mason, replacing the section of SH 43 from Leander to Mason and SH 29 was extended on a new route from Austin to Leander. On July 27, 1926, SH 29 was extended back to Port O'Connor. On January 17, 1928, SH 29 was extended to Rocksprings. On October 25, 1932, the southwest end was shortened to Junction. On February 14, 1933, it extended back to Rocksprings. On June 20, 1933, the southeast end was truncated to north of Cuero, with the portion southeast of there transferred to SH 27. On March 13, 1934, SH 29 was extended through Goliad to Refugio, ending near Gregory, replacing SH 190 and part of SH 119. On July 17, 1934, SH 29 was rerouted to end in Karnes City, replacing part of SH 80 and part of SH 112. On November 27, 1934, SH 29 Spur was created in Goliad. On January 19, 1935, it was rerouted back to Refugio over part of SH 80. The old route was transferred back to SH 80 and SH 112. On February 28, 1935, SH 29 Spur in Goliad was taken over. On July 15, 1935, the sections from Cuero to SH 119 and La Bahia Mission to Gregory were cancelled. On September 22, 1936, the section from Cuero to SH 119 was restored. On November 23, 1937, the section from La Bahia Mission to Gregory was restored. On September 26, 1939, SH 29 Spur was renumbered as Spur 71. On May 23, 1951, the stretch from Liberty Hill to Gregory was reassigned to U.S. Highway 183, and the section from Mason to Rocksprings was reassigned to U.S. Highway 377. On August 22, 1951, SH 29 was extended farther east along former SH 104 from Liberty Hill to Circleville, and was also extended west from Mason along former SH 151 to Eldorado. By 1966, SH 29 had been signed along part of RM 33, all of RM 1980, FM 1257, and part of FM 305 to I-10. On June 30, 1977, the section from Menard to Eldorado, along with the signed section west of Eldorado, was redesignated U.S. Highway 190. In December 1985, SH 29 lost its 3 miles concurrent with US 83 into Menard, shortening SH 29 to its current designation.

SH 29A was a proposed spur route designated on March 19, 1919, splitting at Luling and travelling northwest through San Marcos to Johnson City. On August 21, 1923, it had been renumbered SH 80, which the west end was shortened to end in San Marcos. SH 29A was under a feasibility study from Mason to Menard on February 20, 1928. On June 22, 1928, the feasibility study was completed, and SH 29A was designated. On March 19, 1930, this had been renumbered as SH 151.

SH 29B was a proposed spur route designated on January 15, 1923 from Cuero to San Antonio. On August 21, 1923, it had been renumbered SH 81, which extended northwest to Bandera over part of SH 27.

Route description

US 83 to Burnet
SH 29 begins at an interchange with US 83 south of Menard. SH 29 travels east to Mason, where it begins an overlap with US 377 west of town. The two highways travel into town together where at US 87 SH 29 separates from US 377 and heads south on US 87 for about 1/4 mile before separating and heading east towards Llano. West of Llano, SH 29 begins an overlap with SH 71 that lasts until SH 16 in Llano. Leaving Llano, SH 29 travels on the south side of Buchanan Lake traveling near the Buchanan Dam. Less than a mile after the dam, SH 29 crosses the Colorado River/Inks Lake. The highway then heads towards Burnet, where it intersects US 281.

Burnet to SH 95
Leaving Burnet, SH 29 travels through the towns of Bertram and Liberty Hill before intersecting US 183 at Seward Junction north of Leander. SH 29 then arrives in Georgetown, where it intersects I-35 and serves as the south boundary for Southwestern University. On the east side of town, SH 29 intersects SH 130 then travels through unincorporated Williamson County before ending at SH 95 north of Taylor.

Junction list

References

029
Transportation in Williamson County, Texas
Transportation in Burnet County, Texas
Transportation in Llano County, Texas
Transportation in Mason County, Texas
Transportation in Menard County, Texas